Goodnight, It's Time to Go is the fourth album by organist Jack McDuff recorded in 1961 and released on the Prestige label.

Reception

Scott Yanow of Allmusic states, "This 1961 date was organist Jack McDuff's first with his regular working band. That group included two players who would become synonymous with the organ combo, soul-jazz sound: tenor saxophonist Harold Vick and the up-and-coming guitarist Grant Green".

Track listing 
All compositions by Jack McDuff except as indicated
 "Sanctified Waltz" - 4:51  
 "Goodnight, It's Time to Go" (Calvin Carter, James Hudson) - 6:12  
 "I'll Be Seeing You" (Sammy Fain, Irving Kahal) - 7:35  
 "A Smooth One" (Benny Goodman) - 10:45  
 "McDuff Speaking" - 6:21

Personnel 
Jack McDuff - organ
Harold Vick - tenor saxophone
Grant Green - guitar
Joe Dukes - drums

References 

 

Jack McDuff albums
1961 albums
Prestige Records albums
Albums recorded at Van Gelder Studio
Albums produced by Esmond Edwards